Malappurath Raman Chandrasekharan (born 26 February 1929), popularly known as M.R. Chandrasekharan or simply  M. R. C., is a Malayalam literary critic and author from Kerala, India. Chandrasekharan has published more than 50 books in different literary sections like literary criticism, translations, politics, social etc. He also works in the field of journalism and education. He won the 2010 Kerala Sahitya Akademi Award for Literary Criticism.

Biography
Chandrasekharan was born on 26 Feb 1929 at Pottore, Thrissur (Trichur) in Kerala. His childhood days were spent in the village where he attended the Tirur Lower Secondary School and Vivekodayam High School, Thrissur.  He took his bachelor's degree from Sree Kerala Varma College, Thrissur, BOL from University of Madras and later the master's degree from Kerala University in Malayalam language and literature.

Chandrasekharan started his career as a journalist in Navajeevan edited by Joseph Mundassery for the CPI. Subsequently, he joined as a sub-editor in Mathrubhumi daily in Kozhikode, but was sent out for his communist leanings.

He worked as a school teacher at Kodakara National High School and Bekal Govt. High School. He joined as a lecturer at Malabar Christian College, Kozhikode, in 1956 and moved to Payyannur College, Kannur as senior lecturer in 1965. He retired from Payyannur College, Kannur after over 30 years of teaching service in the year 1989. After retirement he has also worked as Malayalam Professor in Sree Sankaracharya University of Sanskrit.

He is now settled at Ananganadi P.O.Panamanna, Ottappalam in Palghat district, Kerala. He is active with his writings and also enjoys the challenge of organic farming.

Positions held
Chandrasekharan was very much involved in The All Kerala Private College Teachers’ Association(AKPCTA) and served as College Committee Secretary, Regional Secretary, Regional President, General Secretary and President of the association. As association representative, he was elected to the Calicut University Senate and Syndicate.

He was a member of Kerala Sahithya Academy General Council and its Executive Committee.

Chandrasekharan was one of the Directors of the Calicut City Service Co-Operative Bank from the year 2006 till 2013

Chandrasekharan is member of the Academic Council of Thunchath Ezhuthachan Malayalam University established in 2012

In 1961,when Kerala Sahithya Samiti was formed with Kuttipuzha Krishna Pillai as President, S. K. Pottekkatt as Vice President, N. V. Krishna Warrier as General Secretary in Kozhikode, MRC and Vayalar Ramavarma were named secretaries. MRC later served as General Secretary and President of the organisation.

He was also involved in the formation of the Deshabhimani Study Circle, sited as a vigorous and widespread Literary Movement in Kerala along with E. M. S. Namboodiripad, M.S.Devadas, and P.Govindapillai in 1969

He published the literary critical journal "Sahithya Samithi Masika" from Payyanur during 1976-80.

In 1969 when he was the Research Officer at Kerala Bhasha Institute, he worked as the Executive Editor of the magazine "Vignana Kairali".

After retirement in 1989, he took-up the editorship of a magazine called "Chindana" published from Kannur.

He was the Editor of CMP's weekly journal Malayala Mannu (Malayalam:മലയാളമണ്ണ്). He served the journal from 1990 till 2013

Awards and honours 
Chandrasekharan has won the 2010 Kerala Sahitya Akademi Award for Literary Criticism for his book "Malayalam Novel Innum Innaleyum"

He won Dr. C.P.Menon Award for The study of the Progressive School in Literature for his book Keralathile purogamana sahitya prastanathinte charithram for the year 2005.

He has also won the M. N. Sathyaardhi Award in recognition of his contributions to Malayalam literature as a translator. The award is instituted by the M.N. Sathyarthi Trust in memory of the writer who is remembered for his translations of many popular Indian-language works into Malayalam.

He was awarded the MVR award for the year 2018 
https://www.mathrubhumi.com/print-edition/kerala/thiruvananthapuram-1.3290187

Bibliography

Literary Criticism

Political Thinking

Social 
List of Social Books by M. R. C.

Memoirs

Novel Translation

Science Translation

Children's Literature

Other Genres

Journals Edited by MRC

References

Other Links
http://www.thehindu.com/todays-paper/tp-national/tp-kerala/akpcta-district-convention/article3174584.ece 
https://www.amazon.com/M.R.Chandrasekharan/e/B00JQAO64G 
http://www.indulekha.com/index.php?route=product/author/product&author_id=1709 
http://www.mkbhasi.com/mypdf/Mazha1/M%20R%20Chandrasekharan.pdf

Indian literary critics
1929 births
Living people
People from Thrissur district
Writers from Thrissur
Indian children's writers
Indian male writers
20th-century Indian non-fiction writers
20th-century Indian translators
Indian political writers
Indian literary historians
Malayalam-language writers
Indian memoirists
Indian social sciences writers
Scholars from Kerala
Novelists from Kerala
20th-century Indian novelists
21st-century Indian novelists
21st-century Indian translators